Yangzhou High School of Jiangsu Province is a high school in Yangzhou, Jiangsu, China. It grew out of Yidong School, which was established in 1902.

Overview 
Yangzhou High school, one of the key and model schools in Jiangsu Province, is among the first to have been credited as a national model high school. Growing out of Yidong School, which was founded in 1902, it was renamed and relocated several times. The school kept a strenuous effort despite the historical vicissitudes. It is well known for its high ideals, famous teachers, school spirit and talented alumni. The massive alumni cherish the prime time they spent here, where they received a solid foundation of elementary education. Among them are Jiang Zemin, former General Secretary of the Communist Party of China and Chairman of the Central Military Commission, Zhu Ziqing, a distinguished writer, scholar and democratic fighter; 30 members of the Academy of Sciences of China and western countries, such as Huang Minlong, Zhou Zhihong, Li Fangxun, Zhu Wuhua, Liu Dagang, Wu Heng; under-Secretaries-General of the United Nations, Bi Jilong and Xie Qimei; and a large number of experts, scholars, professors, cadres at all levels and labourers of high quality at all walks of life.

Yangzhou High School covers an area of over 120,000 square metres, with building space of over 40,000 square metres. The layout of the campus is organized and provides an elegant, picturesque and tranquil learning environment. The school now has a staff of 200, including 139 teachers, among whom are 63 Senior Teachers (5 Teachers of Special Classification included) and 47 first-Rank teachers, The school puts into practice quality education in an all - round way, vigorously promotes modernizations in education, carries forward its fine tradition to cultivate people, intrepidly brings forth new ideas and strengthens researches on education. As a result, steady progress has been made in the quality of education. The school was credited as Model Unit in Moral Education in Jiangsu Province. Every year more than 100 awards were won in mathematics, physics, chemistry, computer, composition and other contests at or above provincial levels. In the year of 1995, Cheng Jingyang was awarded a gold medal in the 27th International Olympic Chemistry Contest. 95% of the students reached the set standard for physical education and near 100% successfully passed the minimum requirements. Hence, the school was named Model Unit in Mass Sports Activities and Model School in Implementing Physical Education Regulations by the State Physical Culture and Sports Commission. For many years in succession, it was honored Civilized Units at municipal and provincial levels.

To celebrate the 90th anniversary of his alma mater, Jiang Zemin wrote the following inscription: "Cherish the memory of past virtues, encourage the coming successors, inherit the excellent traditions and unite to forge ahead into the future." Inspired by the General Secretary's inscription, the students and staff alike are boldly blazing new trails to build a first-class modern high school while maintaining its unique characteristics and the worldwide highest academic caliber.

Notable alumni
 Professor Kai-Tai Fang, a mathematical statistician.
 Hu Qiaomu
 Jiang Zemin

References

External links
 
 
 
 

High schools in Jiangsu